Roderick Allen Foster (born October 10, 1960) is a retired American professional basketball player (6'1", 160 lb) who played for the Phoenix Suns of the NBA.  He was drafted out of UCLA in 1983 in the second round of the NBA Draft (28th pick overall).

Career

As a senior at St Thomas Aquinas in New Britain, Connecticut, "Rocket" Rod Foster averaged 30.2 points per game, and led his team to the State Championship. He was named an Adidas All-American and second team Parade All-American.

A prized recruit, Foster chose to attend UCLA, recruited to the school by coach Larry Brown.

As a freshman at UCLA, Foster helped lead the Bruins to the 1980 NCAA Division I Basketball Tournament Finals in 1980, where they lost to the Louisville Cardinals, playing under coach Larry Brown. Foster led UCLA with 16 points in the 59–54 loss, adding 6 steals and 5 assists. In the second round of the 1980 NCAA tournament, #8 seed UCLA upset the #1 overall seed DePaul Blue Demons, led by Foster's 18 points in a 77–71 victory. Foster then had 19 points in the next NCAA tournament game, a 72–68 win over the Ohio State Buckeyes. Overall, as a freshman, Foster averaged 11.5 points, 1.9 rebounds and 3.2 assists.

In December 1981, the NCAA put the UCLA basketball program on a two–year probation for violations.

Graduating from UCLA, Foster averaged 12.1 points and 2.1 assists per game, shooting 52.0% from the floor and 88.0% from the line in his 113 game UCLA career.

Foster is listed as one of the best free throw shooters in NCAA history, making 95 of 100 free throw attempts or 95.0% completion in his 1982 season.

Drafted in the 2nd round (28th overall pick) of the 1983 NBA draft, Foster's playing career was ended prematurely due to injury. In his NBA career, Foster averaged 7.2 points and 2.3 assists in 207 career games with the Phoenix Suns.

In March, 1986, Foster suffered a compound fracture in his left leg in a jeep accident in the Arizona desert which ended his playing career. Foster was driving, with Phoenix Suns teammates Mike Sanders and Ed Pinckney as passengers, when the jeep tipped and crushed Foster's leg, causing severe career ending injuries.

Personal

As of 2016, Foster was the head of the L.A. Rockets youth basketball program in Los Angeles. Early in 2016, he also briefly coached the boys varsity high school basketball team at the Windward School in Los Angeles.

In 2020, Foster was named to the CIAC Boys Basketball All–Century team. John Bagley, Kris Dunn, Johnny Egan,
Mike Gminski, Calvin Murphy ( Naismith Memorial Basketball Hall of Fame), Harold Pressley and John Williamson were among the other 24 recipients.

References

External links
NBA statistics

1960 births
Living people
African-American basketball players
All-American college men's basketball players
American men's basketball players
Basketball players from Birmingham, Alabama
Parade High School All-Americans (boys' basketball)
Phoenix Suns draft picks
Phoenix Suns players
Point guards
Quad City Thunder players
Rapid City Thrillers players
San Jose Jammers players
Savannah Spirits players
UCLA Bruins men's basketball players
21st-century African-American people
20th-century African-American sportspeople